Kukolovskaya is a rural locality (a village) in Nizhne-Vazhskoye Rural Settlement, Verkhovazhsky District, Vologda Oblast, Russia. The population was 243 as of 2002. There are 3 streets.

Geography 
Kukolovskaya is located 9 km south of Verkhovazhye (the district's administrative centre) by road. Korovino is the nearest rural locality.

References 

Rural localities in Verkhovazhsky District